Elmlea Junior School may refer to:

Elmlea Junior School, Rexdale, Canada: see Rexdale#Schools.
Elmlea Junior School, Bristol, England: see Education in Bristol.